College Avenue Historic District may refer to:

College Avenue Historic District (Appleton, Wisconsin)
College Avenue Historic District (Waukesha, Wisconsin), listed on the NRHP in Waukesha County, Wisconsin
College Avenue Historic District (Topeka, Kansas), listed on the NRHP in Shawnee County, Kansas
Ashburn Heights-Hudson-College Avenue Historic District, Ashburn, Georgia, listed on the NRHP in Turner County, Georgia
Franklin Street-College Avenue Residential Historic District, Hartwell, Georgia, listed on the NRHP in Hart County, Georgia
West College Avenue Historic District, Hartsville, South Carolina

See also
College Avenue (disambiguation)